"My Train of Thought" is a song written by Bruce Burch and Michael Woody, and recorded by American country music artist Barbara Mandrell.  It was released in February 1989 as the second single from the album I'll Be Your Jukebox Tonight.  The song became Mandrell's final Top 40 single, reaching number 19 on the Billboard Hot Country Singles & Tracks chart.

Chart performance

References

1989 singles
Barbara Mandrell songs
Capitol Records Nashville singles
Songs written by Bruce Burch
Song recordings produced by Tom Collins (record producer)
1988 songs